Kilmichael is a village and civil parish in the barony of West Muskerry, County Cork, Ireland.  Kilmichael P.O. is located on an early map (1897-1913) at the Cooldorragha Cross Roads. Kilmicheal is part of the Cork North-West (Dáil constituency).

Kilmichael Ambush

The Kilmichael Ambush took place near the village during the Irish War of Independence. The actual fight took place in the townlands of Haremount (Cnocán an Ghiorria in Irish) and Shanacashel (Seanchaiseal).

Schools
The local national school, Dromleigh National School, is one of the oldest in Ireland and celebrated its 175th anniversary in 2015. The school was opened in 1840 and still operates from the original school building.

See also
List of towns and villages in Ireland
Cahervagliar, a nearby ringfort

References

Towns and villages in County Cork